Synectics is a problem solving methodology that stimulates thought processes of which the subject may be unaware. This method was developed by George M. Prince (April 5, 1918 – June 9, 2009) and William J.J. Gordon, originating in the Arthur D. Little Invention Design Unit in the 1950s.

History
The process was derived from tape-recording (initially audio, later video) meetings, analysis of the results, and experiments with alternative ways of dealing with the obstacles to success in the meeting. "Success" was defined as getting a creative solution that the group was committed to implement.

The name Synectics comes from Greek and means "the joining together of different and apparently irrelevant elements."

Gordon and Prince named both their practice and their new company Synectics, which can cause confusion, as people not part of the company are trained and use the practice. While the name was trademarked, it has become a standard word for describing creative problem solving in groups.

Theory
Synectics is a way to approach creativity and problem-solving in a rational way. "Traditionally, the creative process has been considered after the fact... The Synectics study has attempted to research creative process in vivo, while it is going on."

According to Gordon, Synectics research has three main assumptions:
The creative process can be described and taught;
Invention processes in arts and sciences are analogous and are driven by the same "psychic" processes;
Individual and group creativity are analogous.
With these assumptions in mind, Synectics believes that people can be better at being creative if they understand how creativity works.

One important element in creativity is embracing the seemingly irrelevant. Emotion is emphasized over intellect and the irrational over the rational. Through understanding the emotional and irrational elements of a problem or idea, a group can be more successful at solving a problem.

Prince emphasized the importance of creative behaviour in reducing inhibitions and releasing the inherent creativity of everyone. He and his colleagues developed specific practices and meeting structures which help people to ensure that their constructive intentions are experienced positively by one another. The use of the creative behaviour tools extends the application of Synectics to many situations beyond invention sessions (particularly constructive resolution of conflict).

Gordon emphasized the importance of metaphorical process' to make the familiar strange and the strange familiar". He expressed his central principle as: "Trust things that are alien, and alienate things that are trusted." This encourages, on the one hand, fundamental problem-analysis and, on the other hand, the alienation of the original problem through the creation of analogies. It is thus possible for new and surprising solutions to emerge.

As an invention tool, Synectics invented a technique called "springboarding" for getting creative beginning ideas. For the development of beginning ideas, the method incorporates brainstorming and deepens and widens it with metaphor; it also adds an important evaluation process for Idea Development, which takes embryonic new ideas that are attractive but not yet feasible and builds them into new courses of action which have the commitment of the people who will implement them.

Synectics is more demanding of the subject than brainstorming, as the steps involved imply that the process is more complicated and requires more time and effort. The success of the Synectics methodology depends highly on the skill of a trained facilitator.

Books
 The Practice of Creativity: A Manual for Dynamic Group Problem-Solving. George M. Prince, 2012, Vermont: Echo Point Books & Media, LLC, 0-9638-7848-4
 The Practice of Creativity by George Prince 1970
 Synectics: The Development of Creative Capacity by W. J. J. Gordon, London, Collier-MacMillan, 1961
 Design Synectics: Stimulating Creativity in Design by Nicholas Roukes, Published by Davis Publications, 1988
 The Innovators Handbook by Vincent Nolan 1989
 Creativity Inc.: Building an Inventive Organization by Jeff Mauzy and Richard Harriman 2003
 Imagine That! by Vincent Nolan and Connie Williams, Publishers Graphics, LLC, 2010

See also
 List of thought processes

References

External links
 George Prince website "Thoughts on Creativity"
Synecticsworld's Founders page on George M. Prince and Bill Gordon

Creativity
Problem solving